Tsedenbalyn Tümenjargal (born 24 February 1989) is a Mongolian international footballer. He has appeared 4 times for the Mongolia national football team in 2011 and was selected as a squad member for the 2014 AFC Challenge Cup qualifiers, during which he scored in the match against Laos.

International goals
Scores and results list the Mongolia's goal tally first.

References

1989 births
Living people
Mongolian footballers
Mongolia international footballers
Association football midfielders
Tuv Buganuud FC players